This is a list of election results for the electoral district of Angas in South Australian elections.

Members for Angas

Election results

Elections in the 1960s

Elections in the 1950s

Elections in the 1940s

 Preferences were not distributed.

 Preferences were not distributed.

Elections in the 1930s

! colspan="6" style="text-align:left;" |After distribution of preferences

 Preferences were not distributed to completion.

References

South Australian state electoral results by district